Nando Boom is a reggae en Español singer from Panamá led by Fernando Brown.

Brown began singing in 1977, and "Nando Boom" started in 1985. Nando Boom's new and speedy music style has influenced heavily the evolution of Latin music over the past few years as one of the fathers of reggae en Español. 
His vm grinding dance moves have also changed the way people dance since the mid-1990s. This backwards dancing style is now the representative dancing of reggaeton listeners.
His most popular songs are "A Danzar" and "Esa Chica Me Vacila", still one of the main songs played in nightclubs all over Latin America.

For many fans and critics he is considered to be a pioneer of reggaeton and one of the most important figures in reggae en Español.

The band received the Caracol of the Caribbean award from Colombia in 1992 and a Stefano award in Miami in 1994.

Nando Boom has released songs with homophobic lyrics, such as the song "No queremos mariflor". He was then criticized by the gay community of Panama.

Partial discography 
 Nando Boom (1988)
 Spanish Reggae (1991)
 Nando Boom & the Explotion Band (1992)
 Greatest Hits (1994)
 Back to Work (1996)

References

External links
 

Panamanian reggaeton musicians
People from Panama City
Year of birth missing (living people)
Living people